Bhawana Somaaya is an Indian film journalist, critic, author and historian. She has been honoured with the Padma Shri in the year 2017 by the President of India Pranab Mukherjee. Starting her career as film reporter in 1978, she went to work with several film magazines, through the 1980s and 1990s. Eventually, she remained editor of Screen, a leading film magazine, from 2000 to 2007. She has written over 13 books on history of Hindi cinema and biographies of Bollywood stars, including Salaam Bollywood (2000), The Story So Far (2003) and her trilogy, Amitabh Bachchan – The Legend (1999), Bachchanalia – The Films And Memorabilia of Amitabh Bachchan (2009) and Amitabh Lexicon (2011).

Early life and background
Somaaya was born and brought up in Mumbai. She is the youngest child among her eight siblings.

She did her schooling from Our Lady of Good Counsel High School in Sion, Mumbai and is also trained in Bharatnatyam dance at Vallabh Sangeetalaya in Andheri West.

After her schooling, she did her graduation in Psychology and acquired a degree in L.L.B. (Criminology) from Government Law College, Mumbai, University of Mumbai. She also studied Journalism at K. C. College, Mumbai.

Career

Somaaya started her career as a film journalist and columnist with in 1978, and writing the column, "Casually Speaking" in film weekly, Cinema Journal published by The Free Press Journal. After working in Super magazine (1980–1981), she joined the Movie magazine published by India Book House as an assistant editor and became co-editor in 1985, and worked here till 1988. In 1989, she became the editor of G, a film magazine by Chitralekha Group. This was followed by her tenure as editor of noted film weekly, Screen from 2000 to 2007.

Meanwhile, she has also worked as costume designer, for actress Shabana Azmi in films like Kaamyaab (1984), Bhavna (1984), Aaj Ka M.L.A. Ram Avtar (1984) and Main Azaad Hoon (1989).

Over the years, her columns have appeared in publications like The Observer, Afternoon, Janmabhoomi, The Hindu, The Hindustan Times and Indian Express. In 1999, she started her career as an author, with biography, Amitabh: The Legend. This led to biographies of other film celebrities, like Lata Mangeshkar and Hema Malini, plus two more book of Amitabh Bachchan, Bachchanalia – The Films And Memorabilia of Amitabh Bachchan (2009) and Amitabh Lexicon (2011). Bachchanalia was co-authored by the Osians Centre for Archiving, Research & Development (CARD) and also included publicity material from the 40 years of his film career. She has also written books on Hindi cinema history, Salaam Bollywood (2000) and  Take 25 – Star Insights and Attitudes (2002), which was released by actress Rekha at a function in Mumbai and entailed Somaaya's 25 years as a film journalist. This was followed by The Story So Far (2003) published by Indian Express and Talking Cinema: Conversations with Actors and Film-Makers (2013).

Shifting to television, in 2008, when she joined Swastik Pictures, a television production company, which made TV series, Amber Dhara as a media consultant. In May 2012, she started appearing on air, as a Friday-film reviewer, BIG FM 92.7, Reliance Media's FM radio station. In 2012, she joined Blockbuster, the newly launched film trade magazine.

Works

References

External links
 Bhavana Somaaya, website
 

Indian magazine editors
Living people
Writers from Mumbai
University of Mumbai alumni
Indian women journalists
Indian film critics
Indian columnists
Indian film historians
Celebrity biographers
20th-century Indian biographers
Year of birth missing (living people)
Journalists from Maharashtra
20th-century Indian women scientists
20th-century Indian scientists
Indian women historians
20th-century Indian historians
20th-century Indian women writers
Indian women non-fiction writers
Women biographers
Indian women columnists
20th-century Indian journalists
Women writers from Maharashtra
Recipients of the Padma Shri in literature & education
21st-century Indian women writers
21st-century Indian writers
21st-century Indian journalists
Women film critics
Women magazine editors